is a ward of the city of Sakai in Osaka Prefecture, Japan. The ward has an area of 10.48 km² and a population of 85,263. The population density is 8,136 per square kilometer. The name means "East Ward."

The wards of Sakai were established when Sakai became a city designated by government ordinance on April 1, 2006.

Transportation

Rail 

 Nankai Electric Railway
 Koya Line: Hatsushiba Station - Hagiharatenjin Station - Kitanoda Station

References

External links

Ward office official webpage 

Wards of Sakai, Osaka